152 Squadron or 152nd Squadron may refer to:

 No. 152 Squadron RAF, a unit of the United Kingdom Royal Air Force
 Marine Aerial Refueler Transport Squadron 152, a unit of the United States Marine Corps